Al-Qasim Sport Club is an Iraqi football team based in Al-Qasim City, Babil, that plays in Iraqi Premier League.

History
Al-Qasim Club was founded in 1973 by a group of young athletes. The team have been in the Iraq Division One for many years and have not been able to qualify for the Premier League due to lack of financial support and lack of a good stadium.

In the 2015–16 season, the team strengthened their ranks with good players and was about to qualify for the Premier League, but finished second behind Al-Bahri in Elite Stage, and Al-Bahri qualified. As well as in the 2017–18 season, but they finished second behind Erbil in Final stage, and Erbil qualified.

Al-Qasim managed to win the 2018–19 Iraq Division One and qualify for the 2019–20 Iraqi Premier League for first time, and chose Al Kifl Stadium to have them a playground for their Premier League matches.

Al-Qasim won the 2018–19 Iraq Division One title after defeating Zakho in the final penalty shootout 4–1, after the match with a draw in the full time.

Current squad

First-team squad

Out on loan

Current technical staff

{| class="toccolours"
!bgcolor=silver|Position
!bgcolor=silver|Name
!bgcolor=silver|Nationality
|- bgcolor=#eeeeee
| Manager:||Ali Abdul Jabbar||
|- 
| Assistant manager:||Saad Attiya||
|- bgcolor=#eeeeee
| Goalkeeping coach:||Hussein Ali||
|-
| U-19 Manager:||Jaafar Talib||
|-bgcolor=#eeeeee
| Director of football:||Rasoul Jassim||
|- 
| Administrative director:||Naim Raheem||
|- bgcolor=#eeeeee
| Administrative director:||Ali Dhaher||
|-
| Club doctor:||Abbas Sami||
|-bgcolor=#eeeeee
| Club doctor:||Baqer Mohammed||
|-

Managerial history

  Jassim Jaber 
  Hussam Fawzi 
  Jassim Jaber 
  Falah Hassan & Chasib Sultan 
  Adel Nima 
  Qusay Munir 
  Sami Bahat 
  Chasib Sultan 
  Ali Abdul Jabbar

Honours 
Iraq Division One
Winner (1): 2018–19

References

External links
 Page on koora.com

1973 establishments in Iraq
Association football clubs established in 1973
Football clubs in Babil